Francis Pratt may refer to:

Francis A. Pratt, engineer
Francis Pratt (baseball)

See also
Frank Pratt (disambiguation)